The Aqueduct Bridge (also called the Alexandria Aqueduct) was a bridge between Georgetown, Washington, D.C., and Rosslyn, Virginia.  It was built to transport cargo-carrying boats on the Chesapeake and Ohio Canal in Georgetown across the Potomac River to the Alexandria Canal.  The same eight piers supported two different bridges: a wooden canal bridge (a wooden roadway bridge was added on top of the canal later) and an  iron truss bridge carrying a roadway and an  electric trolley line. The bridge was closed in 1923 after the construction of the nearby Key Bridge. The shuttered Aqueduct Bridge was demolished in 1933 though its arched, stone abutment on the Georgetown (north) end is still present and overseen by the National Park Service as an historic site.

History

First bridge

In 1830, merchants from Alexandria, Virginia, which was still part of the District of Columbia at the time, proposed linking their city to Georgetown to capitalize on the new Chesapeake and Ohio Canal. Congress granted a charter to the Alexandria Canal Company in 1830, and construction soon began on the Aqueduct Bridge that would carry canal boats across the Potomac River and downriver on the south side without unloading in Georgetown. The bridge was designed by Major William Turnbull. Construction of the bridge and Alexandria Canal began in 1833, and both were completed in 1843. To withstand Potomac ice floes, the piers were made of gneiss, with icebreakers made of granite. The water-filled bridge was a weatherproofed-timber, queen-post truss construction. A narrow carriageway ran alongside the bridge. Later, a separate level for pedestrian and carriage traffic was added to the bridge. The tolls from the addition inhibited trade between Georgetown and Virginia, thus benefiting Alexandrian businessmen who retained Virginian trade.

During the American Civil War, the canal was drained to make a roadway for military troops.

In 1866, the Alexandria Canal Company leased the bridge for 99 years to three local businessmen. The existing wooden superstructure, which had decayed, was replaced with Howe trusses. Wooden arches were later added to strengthen the Howe trusses. In 1868, Congress passed legislation requiring the lessees of the bridge to maintain a highway on the bridge. To support this construction, the lessees were authorized to charge a toll.  A wooden floor was placed atop the Howe trusses, and wooden trestles built on both ends to provide approaches to the bridge.

Second bridge

In the 1882, legislation was introduced in Congress to purchase the Aqueduct Bridge and open it to the public. But the bill did not pass. Legislation was again introduced in January 1884. This legislation was ultimately successful. At issue, however, was who would bear the cost of buying the bridge. Congress initially proposed that the District of Columbia shoulder the entire cost, but the city did not have the funds. Citizens in Virginia demanded that Congress pick up cost, arguing this was an interstate bridge and therefore a national concern. Congress passed the legislation, and appropriated $240,000 to purchase the bridge. The Alexandria Canal Company sold the bridge's piers for $85,000 and its deck for $50,000, and the deed was conveyed to the federal government on August 15, 1884. Almost immediately, a dispute broke out among the canal company's shareholders as to the distribution of the funds, which suspended the transfer of deed.

The safety of the bridge was quickly called into question. In December 1885, just a year after the bridge was purchased, the United States Army Corps of Engineers conducted a study that found the wooden bridge so unsafe that it should be removed. Again, cost considerations came to the fore. Legislation was introduced in Congress in May 1886 to have a new bridge built, with the D.C. government picking up half the cost. A D.C. engineering study of the bridge was conducted in September 1886 to again determine the bridge's safety. This report for the bridge so unsafe that it recommended immediate closure. The District government did so on October 5, 1886.

On October 20, 1886, the canal company shareholders finally settled on how to distribute the purchase funds amongst themselves. The District government then asked the Secretary of War (who supervised the Corps of Engineers) whether the federal government intended to repair the bridge or build a new one. But issues concerning the sale still plagued the bridge. Although a new deed of transfer was prepared in mid-November 1886, the Alexandria Canal Company sued the federal government in December 1886 to receive the full sale price all at once (rather than in installments). Another Corps engineering report on the bridge was made in January 1887. With the bridge again found to be unsafe to open, the federal government sued the canal company. The deed of sale, the government said, required the company to maintain a bridge that is open to travel for 20 years. This condition had not been met, and the government sought $84,500 in reimbursements to cover construction of a new deck.

Meanwhile, the Corps of Engineers reported in January 1887 that a new bridge could be constructed for $105,000 (the sum of money left over from the 1884 appropriation). With this money already in hand, no new legislation was needed. Bids for construction of the new bridge were received in March 1887, and a contract awarded to the Mt. Vernon Bridge Company. Work began in August. But extensive delays plagued the bridge. One reason for the delay was the need to obtain a new right-of-way from the Chesapeake and Ohio Canal, which the bridge would cross. Suit for the right-of-way was filed in December 1887, and the Chesapeake and Ohio Canal agreed to provide it (pending an appraisal) in January 1888. But work continued to be slow due to inefficient work practices by the contractor, delaying the opening until at least January 1889. Construction problems delayed the opening of the bridge until June 1, 1889.

In 1889, the northern arch in the Washington abutment was enlarged so that the Georgetown Branch of the Baltimore and Ohio Railroad could pass underneath.  When that line was abandoned, Water Street NW was extended west through the passageway to the Washington Canoe Club.  The empty lot before the canoe club had previously been occupied by Dempsey's Canoe Livery.  The rest of the Georgetown Branch right-of-way is now occupied by the Capital Crescent Trail. One of the piers was replaced in 1900.

In 1906, the Great Falls and Old Dominion Railroad (GF&OD) began to operate a single-track electric trolley line on a cantilever structure that the railroad had constructed on the bridge's west (upstream) side.  In 1912, the GF&OD became the Great Falls Division of the new Washington and Old Dominion Railway.

Building Key Bridge
Proposals were made to replace Aqueduct Bridge as early as 1901. But these proposals were delayed when the McMillan Plan was issued in 1902. Congress approved the construction of a wooden superstructure that extended outward from the upstream side of the bridge's deck to carry electric trolleys between Georgetown and Rosslyn in 1902. Construction began in May 1903, and involved reconstruction of one of the bridge's piers. Built by the Great Falls and Old Dominion Railroad, trolleys of the railroad and its successor, the Washington and Old Dominion Railway, traversed the bridge until its closure in 1923.

Ice jams were a routine hazard on the Potomac River into the 1960s. Although the jams often stuck against the bridge, it weathered them well until 1908. Ice damaged some of the bridge's piers, requiring reconstruction of Pier No. 1 in the summer. Engineers discovered that many of the bridge's piers had been undermined by water, and rush repairs were made. But the aging structure continued to suffer damage, and by September 1912 the bridge was leaning dangerously to the west. Fears that the bridge would give way during the spring ice jams worsened. The bridge piers were extensively repaired again in 1913.

The Carlin bill
In March 1914, Representative Charles Creighton Carlin of Virginia sponsored legislation to replace Aqueduct Bridge with a new, $1 million structure. The Commissioners of the District of Columbia (the city's appointed government) approved of the new bridge in June. Controversy over the new bridge immediately broke out. July 10, 1914.</ref> Georgetown merchants strongly opposed this plan. There were some in Congress who wanted to repair the existing bridge, but a study by the United States Army Corps of Engineers in August 1914 showed that the existing structure was inadequate for the amount of traffic and too unstable to be saved. Secretary of War Lindley Miller Garrison, who oversaw the Corps, agreed that a new bridge was necessarily in December. Rep. William C. Adamson, chairman of the House Committee on Public Works, challenged Swanson and declared that the new bridge should be placed where the old one was.

The Carlin bill began moving through the House in January 1915. But House members balked at the cost. Garrison tried to break the deadlock on January 9 by issuing a report that declared the existing bridge unsafe, and requesting that the new one be built in the same location. The D.C. Commissioners said the location of the bridge was up to them, and the Corps warned that not only could the existing bridge not be enlarged but agreed with Garrison that it was structurally unsound. Swanson changed his mind, and agreed in January 1916 that the new bridge should be built on the existing site. Garrison endorsed the Carlin bill on January 27. On February 3, 1916, vehicular traffic over Aqueduct Bridge was limited by the city to a single automobile at a time due to its dangerous nature. The House passed legislation appropriating $1.175 million for construction of a new bridge on March 6. D.C. commissioners held hearings on the bridge site in late March, and approved the site in early April. The Senate passed some minor amendments to the House bill, and after some legislative discussions and a conference committee, the Carlin bill passed Congress on May 2, 1916. President Woodrow Wilson signed the legislation on May 19.

Demolition of Aqueduct Bridge

On June 1, 1916, the Army Corps of Engineers named the new bridge "Francis Scott Key Bridge," in honor of the man who had written the lyrics to the Star Spangled Banner whose home was just a few blocks from the bridge's abutment. Plans began to be drawn up at that time. The plans were nearly complete by September. When repairs on Aqueduct Bridge were made in October 1916 to prepare the structure for winter, the Corps discovered even more deterioration than before.

In January 1917, the Corps of Engineers found that inflation in the price of construction materials made it necessary to ask for $300,000 more in funding from Congress. Congress balked at paying. But citizen pressure and the danger of collapse due to ice flows in the spring convinced Congress to pay the money.  Construction contracts were drawn up in late February, and excavation work on the D.C. abutments began in March. The first coffer dam for construction of the piers was sunk in May 1918, and, in July 1921, the Aqueduct Bridge was ordered to be closed.  The new $2.35 million Key Bridge opened on January 17, 1923, whereupon the Aqueduct Bridge was closed to traffic.

Although Georgetown citizens pressed for the old Aqueduct Bridge span to remain open for use as a recreation site, the bridge was razed beginning in December 1933. The Aqueduct Bridge's superstructure and most of the above-water portions of its piers were removed in 1933. The bases of the piers were retained to protect the Key Bridge's piers from ice floe damage.

The piers, however, were criticized by recreational boaters (particularly rowers from nearby Georgetown University) as an obstacle to enjoyment of the river and a navigational hazard. Army engineers and Rep. Joel Broyhill refused to remove the piers, citing their value to protecting Key Bridge and the cost of their removal. But in August 1962, these groups agreed that seven of the eight Aqueduct Bridge piers would be removed (with one pier remaining as a historical marker). Dismantling of the piers began on September 11, 1962.

The Aqueduct Bridge's Washington abutment and a remnant of the bridge's Virginia abutment still survive. Both are located a short distance west (upstream) of the Key Bridge.  The southern arch of the Washington abutment shelters rowing shells belonging to members of the Potomac Boat Club.  Between the abutments, the preserved pier remains in place near the river's Virginia shoreline.

A coalition of Georgetown business groups and residents have joined with Georgetown University to advocate the construction of a gondola that would cross the river along the former path of the Aqueduct Bridge. Conceptual images show that a pole supporting the gondola's cables would rise from the bridge's remaining pier.

Images

First bridge

First bridge after superstructure built

Second bridge

Remnants

See also
List of bridges documented by the Historic American Engineering Record in Washington, D.C.

Notes

References
"Appendix B B B - Bridges at Washington, D.C." Annual Reports of the War Department for the Fiscal Year Ended June 30, 1901. Part 5. Report of the Chief of Engineers. United States Department of War. Washington, D.C.: Government Printing Office, 1901.
Gillette, Howard. Between Justice and Beauty: Race, Planning, and the Failure of Urban Policy in Washington, D.C. Philadelphia: University of Pennsylvania Press, 2006.
Goode, James M. Capital Losses: A Cultural History of Washington's Destroyed Buildings. Washington, D.C.: Smithsonian Books, 2003.
, 2000. at Google Books.
Hurst, Harold W. Alexandria on the Potomac: The Portrait of An Antebellum Community. Lanham, Md.: University Press of America, 1991.
Kapsch, Robert J. Canals. New York: W.W. Norton and Library of Congress, 2004.
Reed, Robert Carroll. Old Washington, D.C., in Early Photographs, 1846-1932. New York: Dover Publications, 1980.

Further reading
 Turnbull, William. Reports on the Construction of the Piers of the Aqueduct of the Alexandria Canal across the Potomac River at Georgetown, District of Columbia. Engineer Department. United States Army. Washington, D.C.: Government Printing Office, 1873.
 Peterson, Arthur G. The Old Alexandria-Georgetown Canal & Potomac Aqueduct'' Virginia Magazine of History & Biography vol.40, no.4 (Oct. 1932)

External links

Road bridges in Washington, D.C.
History of Washington, D.C.
Road bridges in Virginia
Bridges completed in 1843
Bridges completed in 1868
Bridges completed in 1886
Bridges over the Potomac River
Demolished buildings and structures in Washington, D.C.
Historic American Engineering Record in Washington, D.C.
Navigable aqueducts in the United States
Transportation in Arlington County, Virginia
Chesapeake and Ohio Canal
Former toll bridges in Virginia
Former toll bridges in Washington, D.C.
1843 establishments in Virginia
Georgetown (Washington, D.C.)
Stone arch bridges in the United States